New Serbia (NS) is a right-wing political party in Serbia. It was established in 1998 by a group of dissidents led by Velimir Ilić from the Serbian Renewal Movement (SPO).

History
New Serbia was part of the Democratic Opposition of Serbia (DOS) bloc which defeated Slobodan Milošević in the 2000 presidential election.

The party took part in the 2003 parliamentary election in coalition with the Serbian Renewal Movement. The coalition received 7.7% of the popular vote and 22 seats; 9 seats were allocated to New Serbia.

New Serbia ran in the 2007 election in coalition with the Democratic Party of Serbia (DSS) and United Serbia (JS). The coalition received 16.55% of the popular vote and 47 seats in parliament, 10 of which went to New Serbia.

The party ran again in coalition with the DSS a year later in the 2008 election, receiving 11.62% of votes and 30 seats, with 9 allocated to NS.

New Serbia ran in the 2014 election in coalition with the Serbian Progressive Party (SNS) and several other parties. The coalition received 48.2% of the popular vote and 158 seats in parliament, 6 of which went to New Serbia.

Presidents

Electoral performance

Parliamentary elections

Years in government (1990– )

Presidential elections

References

External links
 

1998 establishments in Serbia
Conservative parties in Serbia
Eastern Orthodox political parties
Monarchist parties in Serbia
Nationalist parties in Serbia
Political parties established in 1998
Right-wing populism in Serbia
Right-wing parties in Europe
Serb nationalist parties
Social conservative parties